Morgen hör ich auf is a German television series that premiered on January 2, 2016 on ZDF.

Plot
The Lehmanns are a German average family - three children, houses, car - and live in the small town of Bad Nauheim in Hesse, near Frankfurt. What looks like a showpiece family from the outside shows strong internal cracks, just like the broken house roof and the water damage in the bedroom. The family printing is deep in the crisis, the credit on the house has long been at the stop, and father Jochen (Bastian Pastewka) threatens to collapse under the financial pressure. Mother Julia (Susanne Wolff) is having fun with a lover, son Vincent (Moritz Jahn) is a nerd, teenage daughter Laura (Janina Fautz) only has her "crush" in her head, and baby nestling Nadine (Katharina Kron) is rather a small one devil than the cute sunshine for which they hold their parents.
But Jochen gets almost nothing from it, desperately he tries to keep the bill and get a new loan from the bank. But no matter how much he humbles himself, the bankers turn the tap, and house and company are constantly slipping toward the abyss. In an act of blind desperation, Jochen throws his printing presses one night and begins to print fifty "fifties": If everyone wants money from him, then he does it himself. He quickly comes to his senses, but then it is already too late: one phony is making its way into the economic cycle. When nothing happens, Jochen continues and begins to bring the counterfeit money in Frankfurt under the people. He draws attention to the Frankfurt underworld, and suddenly he gets deeper and deeper into a vortex of criminal machinations from which he can not get out.

Episodes

See also
List of German television series

References

External links

2010s German television miniseries
2016 German television series debuts
2016 German television series endings
German-language television shows
ZDF original programming